The black foot disease is a grapevine trunk disease. It is caused by fungi in the genus Cylindrocarpon (C. fasciculare, C. pseudofasciculare, C. destructans, C. macrodidymum and C. obtusisporum).

References 

Grapevine trunk diseases